"People Have the Power" is a rock song written by Patti Smith and Fred "Sonic" Smith, and released as a lead single from Patti Smith's 1988 album Dream of Life. The cover photograph is by Robert Mapplethorpe. The music video is filmed mostly in black-and-white and features Patti Smith singing, writing and walking.

The song was ranked number 22 on NME magazine's list of the "Singles of the Year".

Live performances
In 2019, Smith performed the song with 250 volunteer singers at The Public Theater.
For most of U2's 2015 Innocence + Experience Tour, the group used "People Have the Power" as their entrance music. Smith herself joined them to close their show with a performance of the song at  London's O2 Arena on October 29, as well as the December 6 show at Accorhotels Arena in Paris. On December 7, to close their show and the tour at Accorhotels Arena, U2 invited Eagles of Death Metal on-stage to perform the song with them. It was Eagles of Death Metal's first public performance since the attack on their 13 November 2015 concert at the Bataclan in Paris that resulted in 89 fatalities.

Charts

Notes

External links 
 
 Lyrics at Random House

1987 songs
1988 singles
Patti Smith songs
Protest songs
Songs written by Patti Smith
Song recordings produced by Jimmy Iovine
Arista Records singles
Songs written by Fred "Sonic" Smith